The 1919–20 Austrian First Class season was the ninth season of top-tier football in Austria. With the league expanded to a twelve team competition, it was won by SK Rapid Wien by goal average over SV Amateure.

League standings

Results

References
Austria - List of final tables (RSSSF)

Austrian Football Bundesliga seasons
Austria
1919–20 in Austrian football